Neptis gratiosa is a butterfly in the family Nymphalidae. It is found in Angola, the Democratic Republic of the Congo (Sankuru and Shaba), northern Zambia, Mozambique, north-western Tanzania and Kenya. The habitat consists of grassy woodland.

References

Butterflies described in 1955
gratiosa